Aissa Koli also called Aisa Kili Ngirmaramma was a queen regnant in the Kanem–Bornu Empire in 1497–1504 or 1563–1570.

There are some discrepancies about the parentage and dates of her rule. The Arabic historians did not record her rule, but they are noted to have ignored female rulers; it is also noted that her successor Idris Aloma imposed a Muslim bureaucracy on the pagan population and that this Islamic records ignored her because of her sex. She is however preserved in local African tradition as her male counterparts.

Aissa Koli was reportedly the daughter of King Ali Gaji Zanani. Her father ruled for one year and was succeeded by a relative, Dunama, who died the year of his succession. During Dunama's reign, he had declared that all the sons of his predecessor should be killed, and Aissa's five-year-old half-brother Idris was therefore sent away to Bulala in secret by his mother. When Dunama died, Aissa succeeded him as ruler in the absence of any male heir, as she was unaware that her half-brother was still alive. According to another version, Aissa was instead the daughter of King Dunama.

Queen Aissa ruled for seven years, which was the stipulated term for all rulers, as the custom was not that a monarch reign for life, but only for a fixed period and she thereby fulfilled a full term. When her term was up, she was informed of the existence of her half-brother, who was by then twelve years on age, named Idris. She called him back and had him crowned as her successor, and continued as his adviser for the first years of his reign.

References
 Guida Myrl Jackson-Laufer: Women Rulers Throughout the Ages: An Illustrated Guide
 Women in World History: A Biographical Encyclopedia

Women rulers in Africa
History of women in Nigeria
Rulers of the Bornu Empire
16th-century monarchs in Africa
16th-century Nigerian women
16th-century women rulers
15th-century women rulers
Chadian women in politics